Iddi(n)-Sin (: Iddî-Sîn) was a King (𒈗 Šàr, pronounced Shar) of the Kingdom of Simurrum around 2000 to 1900 BCE. Simurrum was an important city state of the Mesopotamian area, during the period of the Akkadian Empire down to Ur III. The Simurrum Kingdom disappears from records after the Old Babylonian period. According to an inscription (the stela now located in the Sulaymaniyah Museum), Iddi(n)-Sin seems to have been contemporary with the Lullubi king Annubanini.

Several rulers of the Simurrum Kingdom are known, such as Iddi(n)-Sin and his son Zabazuna. Various inscriptions suggest that they were contemporary with king Ishbi-Erra (1953—c. 1920 BCE). In inscriptions, the name of Iddi(n)-Sin is written 𒀭𒄿𒋾𒀭𒂗𒍪, with one silent determinative (𒀭, DINGIR) before the remaining part of the name, 𒄿𒋾𒀭𒂗𒍪. 𒄿𒋾 can be read as i-ti with the geminated 't' being implied, and then in English the double 't' sound is taken more as a double 'd'. The 'n' is then added in English though not explictly written in the Akkadian cuneiform. The second 𒀭 (DINGIR) acts as a determinative for the last part 𒂗𒍪 are the signs EN.ZU. Thus all three together form the logogram DEN.ZU, which is read as Sîn, name of the Moon God.

Four inscriptions and a relief of the Simurrum have been identified at Bitwata near Ranya in Iraqi Kurdistan, near the border with Iran, including the large relief now in the Israel Museum, and one from Sarpol-e Zahab. It is thought that the design of the relief is derived from the Victory Stele of Naram-Sin, King of the Akkadian Empire (2254-2218 BCE), in which the king is also seen trampling enemies. It is also similar to other reliefs in the area, such as the Anubanini rock relief. The Sarpol-e Zahab relief, representing a beardless warrior with axe, trampling a foe, and inscribed with the name "Zaba(zuna), son of ...", may be the son of Iddi(n)-Sin.

Iddi-Sin is also known from a stele, which he inscribed in the Akkadian language, now in the Sulaymaniyah Museum, Iraq.

A seal showing Iddi(n)-Sin and his son Zabazuna (: Za-ba-zu-na), is also known from the Rosen collection.

See also 

 Anobanini rock relief

References

External links
 
 Ancient History.The Secret History of Iddi-Sin’s Stela

Middle Eastern monarchs
20th-century BC monarchs